There are two species of skink named Guinea mabuya:

 Trachylepis albilabris, found in Africa
 Trachylepis aureogularis, found in Guinea, Liberia, Ivory Coast, and Ghana